Sylvia Plath (1932–1963) was an American author and poet. Plath is primarily known for her poetry, but earned her greatest reputation for her semi-autobiographical novel The Bell Jar, published pseudonymously weeks before her death.

Poems
Plath published dozens of poems, including:
"Daddy"
"Lady Lazarus"
"Mad Girl's Love Song"
"The Munich Mannequins"
"Tulips"
"Two Lovers and a Beachcomber by the Real Sea"

Children's books and novel
Plath published only one book in her lifetime—the novel The Bell Jar—but several collected editions of her poetry, short stories, letters, and children's books were published posthumously.

The Bell Jar (1963), under the pseudonym "Victoria Lucas"
The Bed Book (children's book – 1976)
The It-Doesn't-Matter-Suit (children's book – 1996)
Collected Children's Stories (children's book – 2001)
Mrs. Cherry's Kitchen (children's book – 2001)

Letters and journal
Several of Plath's letters and her personal journal were published after her death. Most of her manuscripts are held in the Cambridge and Indiana University libraries.
Letters Home: Correspondence 1950–1963 (1975)
The Journals of Sylvia Plath (1982)
The Unabridged Journals of Sylvia Plath, edited by Karen V. Kukil (2000)

Collected editions
There are several limited-edition collections of Plath's work. Significant compilations include:
The Colossus and Other Poems (TC) (1960 – American and British editions are different)
Ariel (A) (1965 – American and British editions are different)
Uncollected Poems (UC) (1965)
Fiesta Melons (FM) (1971)
Crossing the Water (CtW) (1971 – American and British editions are different)
Winter Trees (WT) (1972 – American and British editions are different)
Johnny Panic and the Bible of Dreams (JP) (short stories, 1977)
The Collected Poems (TCP) (1981)
Selected Poems (SP) (1985)
Plath: Poems (PP) (1998)

Others
The Magic Mirror (1989), Plath's Smith College senior thesis

Three Women: A Monologue for Three Voices (1968) play

Drawings

Interviews
The Poet Speaks edited by Peter Orr, published by Barnes and Noble in New York City (1966), pp.167–172

Editing – American Poetry Now: A Selection of the Best Poems by Modern American Writers, appended to Critical Quarterly Poetry Supplement, number 2 in 1961

Sylvia Plath Reads, Harper Audio 2000
Plath Reads Plath – 1975, Released as a gramophone record by Credo Records and on Compact Disc by Harper Audio in 2000

The Art of Sylvia Plath 1970:
 Dialogue en Route c. 1951
 Miss Drake Proceeds to Supper 1956
 On the Plethora of Dryads 1956
 Epitaph for Fire and Flower 1956
 Battle-Scene from the Comic Operatic Fantasy The Seafarer 1957
 Words for a Nursery 1957
 Mushrooms 1959
 In Plaster 1961
 An Appearance 1962
 Lesbos 1962
 Purdah 1962
 Mystic 1963
 Excerpt from a radio play Three Women 1962
 OCEAN 1212-W 1962
 Thalidomide
 Pen drawings by Sylvia Plath

Full list of publications

References

 
Plath, Sylvia